Top of the Order is an out-of-print collectible card game by Donruss and NXT Games with a baseball theme using images of baseball players. The game was first released in October 1995. The base set had 360 cards and came in 80-card starter decks and 12-card booster packs. The game was said to resemble Strat-O-Matic in the amount of game detail. An expansion was tentatively scheduled for a June 1996 release but never materialized.

Gameplay involved using only one type of card, the Player card. Each Player had 17 statistics. Offensive players would play a card representing the type of swing a batter is using, while the defensive manager would choose the pitch with a card play. To resolve the play, each player would draw the top card of their deck and compare them to one or more tables to determine the outcome.

References

Further reading

Card games introduced in 1995
Collectible card games
Wizards of the Coast games